Thulluvadho Ilamai is a 2002 Indian Tamil-language teen drama film written and directed by Selvaraghavan, but Kasthuri Raja is credited for business reasons and the film marks the acting debut of Dhanush, who plays the lead role. The film also features other newcomers Abhinay, Sherin, Ramesh, Shilpa and Gangeshwari in major roles, and features prominent film personalities Vijayakumar, Ramesh Khanna, and Pyramid Natarajan playing supporting roles.

The film depicts the story of six high-school classmates, three boys and three girls, coming from different strata of society, who have each their own problems in their respective families and escape from their homes, deciding to live together on their own with the help of an older friend of theirs.

While the soundtrack was composed by Yuvan Shankar Raja, Viji Manuel composed the film score. The film was released on 10 May 2002. The film was remade in Telugu as Juniors (2003) with Sherin reprising her role.

Plot 
Mahesh is the son of a fisherman. He grows up seeing his parents always having sex or quarrelling. Pooja is the daughter of an orthodox and very strict businessman, who is always suspicious about her. Vishnu's father neglects his mother and instead has his maid as his paramour. Anitha's parents live abroad, concentrating merely on their work and business, having no time for their daughter and always neglecting her. Harish is regularly beaten up and mistreated by his sadistic father. These five people and another girl named Divya are high school students and best friends. When they find out that Anitha is addicted to drugs, they decide to run away from their homes along with Mani, a pavement bookseller and an older friend of theirs in order to rehabilitate her, but also as a result of their discontent and feeling of alienation from their respective families.

However, their attempts are a waste. They struggle to survive in the outside world. Being young and immature, their daily life becomes hell for them. They reside in a hotel and get caught by the police, who mistake them to be doing illicit activities. Rescued by Mani, they roam the streets and seek shelter in abandoned places. They try to make money for themselves after the cash they brought with them is taken by the inspector. Contacting their parents make their situation worse. All of them realise that their parents do not care about them at all and would not even bother to worry if they are dead. Feeling disappointed, they continue on their journey. Pooja and Mahesh, at a stage, get intimate, much to Divya's shock. When she questions Harish and scolds Divya, neither of them speak a word. Vishnu soon realises that the remaining money that he had went missing, and Anitha too is nowhere to be found. Suspecting her to have been going behind drugs, they start looking for her. Late at night, Vishnu, Mani, and Mahesh go looking for Anitha while Pooja and Divya stay with Harish.

The friends spot Anitha being brought by a man to be sell her as a prostitute and Harish fight them, only to get stabbed. Realising that they have no other way to survive 'safely' in this world, they decide to return home. They finally return to their school, where the principal lectures the students' parents, blaming them for the students' escape attempt and misbehavior. Hearing the principal's words and her father scolding her, Pooja consumes an unnamed acid from her school lab. Upon hearing this, Mahesh jumps from the second floor. Both are rushed to the hospital, where fortunately, they survive. Ignoring the parents, the rest of their class and batch mates get into the ICU to meet them. Happy that they are safe, they start laughing and mocking each other. The principal tells the parents that they are not worried about what happened and are happy. Feeling ashamed, the parents leave the children alone.

All these are told in a flashback where Mahesh, now in the military, comes back to his school and recalls the memories. He had not disturbed Pooja after that and does not know where his friends are now. Assuring himself that they would have been well off as he is now, he gets interrupted by the principal. But the principal does not recognise Mahesh and walks off. Mahesh tells himself that the principal does not remember him as he would have seen many students in all these years.

Cast 

Dhanush as Mahesh
Sherin as Pooja
Abhinay as Vishnu
Ramesh as Harish
Shilpa as Anitha
Gangeshwari as Divya
Ramesh Khanna as Mani
Vijayakumar as School Principal
Thalaivasal Vijay as Mahesh's father
Pyramid Natarajan as Pooja's father
Nizhalgal Ravi as Vishnu's father
Ishari K. Ganesh as Police Inspector
Dhanusha Murugasan as Kavitha
Ashok Raja in a special appearance in the song "Kaatrukku Kaatrukku"

Production 
Selvaraghavan, son of director Kasthuri Raja, had written the script and also directed the film. When his family faced financial pressures in the early 2000s with his father was out of work, and subsequently, they decided to put their remaining earnings into the film. The film began production during September 2000. It was the debut film of Selvaraghavan's younger brother Dhanush. Post-filming, the producers found it difficult to find a distributor. Director R. Madhesh later purchased and released the film.

Music 
The soundtrack was composed by Yuvan Shankar Raja, marking the first collaboration of the Yuvan Shankar Raja-Selvaraghavan duo, which would later go on to become one of the most successful combos in Tamil cinema. Viji Manuel composed the film score on Yuvan Shankar Raja's request who had to leave for London on an urgent work. The soundtrack initially featured 7 songs overall, later a second CD was released which included 3 additional short tracks. The song "Theenda Theenda", based on the Carnatic raga Reetigowla, had two versions, a female solo and a duet version. The lyrics were written by Pa. Vijay except one song, was written by Selvaraghavan.

Release and reception 
Thulluvadho Ilamai was released on 10 May 2002. Tulika of Rediff.com called the film "an example of moviemaking smarts", adding, "Sitting in a movie theatre watching someone else live out their problems and find solutions, helps". Visual Dasan of Kalki called the film "above average". After taking a small opening, the film began to get teen audiences to cinema halls for its adolescent themes. It subsequently went on to become a sleeper hit. Post-release, Selvaraghavan stated that he had also directed the film but was forced to credit his more established filmmaker father as the sole director, to help the project find a distributor.

The success of the film prompted Kasthuri Raja to launch a film title Theenda Theenda, inspired by the song from the film, but it was shelved. The film was later remade in Telugu as Juniors (2003), with Sherin reprising her role.

Notes

References

External links 
 
 

2000s coming-of-age drama films
2000s Tamil-language films
2000s teen drama films
2002 films
Films directed by Kasthuri Raja
Films scored by Yuvan Shankar Raja
Indian coming-of-age drama films
Indian teen drama films
Tamil films remade in other languages